Vladimir Vasilevich Makarov (9 March 1947 – 11 August 1979) was a Soviet footballer.

Club career
Makarov played for clubs in Tajikistan and Ukraine from 1969 to 1977.  For the last two years of his life, he starred at Pakhtakor Tashkent as a forward in 1978 and 1979, before he died in a mid-air plane crash in August 1979. He was classified as a Master of Sport of the USSR in 1969.

External links

1947 births
1979 deaths
Sportspeople from Dushanbe
Tajikistani footballers
Soviet footballers
Association football forwards
Pakhtakor Tashkent FK players
CSKA Pamir Dushanbe players
FC Chornomorets Odesa players
Soviet Top League players
Victims of aviation accidents or incidents in the Soviet Union
Victims of aviation accidents or incidents in Ukraine